3,5-Difluoro-4-hydroxybenzylidene imidazolidinone or DFHBI is an imidazolidinone fluorophore used in various biochemical studies. The benzene ring of DFHBI can freely rotate around the single bond but when it is fixed in planar conformation, DFHBI floresces. It is a synthetic analog of the GFP fluorophore.

References 

Imidazolidinones
Fluoroarenes
Phenols